Alan Paine Radebaugh, a contemporary American artist, was born May 2, 1952, in Boston, Massachusetts, was raised in Maine and New York, and moved to New Mexico in 1979.

He grew up painting, primarily in oils. At the College of Wooster, where he enrolled to study premed, he spent his time taking photographs and designing jewelry. He left Wooster to become a jeweler, later spent ten years designing sculptural art furniture, received a BFA in printmaking from the University of New Mexico, and returned to painting full time in 1988. 

Radebaugh's work has been shown in museums and galleries in the United States and abroad. In 2004, he had a 20-year retrospective, Alan Paine Radebaugh: Chasing Fragments 1984–2004, in Albuquerque, NM.  In 2007 Mass: Of Our World,  which was exhibited at the Jonson Gallery of the University of New Mexico Art Museum, won an award for excellence in fine arts. He began his current artistic project, Ghost of Sea, in 2008.

His artworks are housed in the collections of corporations and cultural institutions including Albuquerque Museum of Art and History; New Mexico Museum of Fine Arts, Santa Fe; Ohio State University–Shisler Center, Wooster, Ohio; Portland Museum of Art, Portland, Maine; Roswell Museum and Art Center, New Mexico; The College of Wooster, Ohio; University of New Mexico Art Museum; Bates College Museum of Art, Lewiston, Maine; Marian Graves Mugar Art Gallery, Colby-Sawyer College, New London, New Hampshire; Nicolaysen Art Museum, Casper, Wyoming; and Olin Fine Art Gallery, Washington and Jefferson College, Washington, Pennsylvania.

Analysis of Work
David L. Bell, writing about Radebaugh's sculptural furniture, noted that it has "acute proportion, impeccable detailing."

In critiquing New Mexico landscape artists, Wesley Pulkka commented, "Dappled by sunlight and rough textured as tree bark, Radebaugh's surfaces celebrate nature like a Gerard Manley Hopkins poem."

In a later analysis of Radebaugh's work, Douglas Kent Hall wrote, "Radebaugh is clearly a landscape painter. Yet, he is a landscape painter of a very different kind…. To a certain degree Radebaugh is doing what Jackson Pollock did as an artist….Radebaugh, too, is an action painter….The action he presents is in slow motion, few drips, if any, but plenty of gesture. The painting is what he creates….If Pollock and others from the abstract expressionist school freed line and form from their traditional roles in painting, Radebaugh has responded to their spontaneity and extended it with his almost self-conscious linear detailing."

Jeanne Shoaf, curator of art at the Lincoln Center Art Gallery, wrote that "Radebaugh’s complex patterns of negative and positive space capture the stark shadow and light of the plains. The resulting landscapes shape-shift between abstraction and representation, echoing the glints of sun off the shining sea. Ultimately, he makes visible the ghostlike imprint of the sea across the horizon of these Great Plains."

According to Mary Tsiongas, professor of art, University of New Mexico, "Radebaugh re-members the geological past and encodes it in pigment and strokes in the surfaces of these works. . . . Radebaugh paints to translate  the experience [of landscape] beyond light, beyond form, to somehow activate our senses and engage us, too, in the long and intricate history of the places he paints.”

References

Further reading
Douglas Kent Hall, "Art of Albuquerque 2002: A World of Paint and Polish,"  Art of Albuquerque (Albuquerque: Magnifico, 2002), 4.
The Collector's Guide, "Alan Paine Radebaugh," Art Journey New Mexico: 104 Painters' Perspectives (Cincinnati: The Collector's Guide, 2009), 162–63.
Pamela Wissman and Stefanie Laufersweiler, eds., Sketchbook Confidential (Cincinnati, OH: F & W Media, 2010).

External links
 Alan Paine Radebaugh official Web site

American artists
1952 births
Living people